Yaozhou may refer to:

Yaozhou District, in Tongchuan, Shaanxi, China
Yaozhou ware, pottery made there